Starrbooty is a 2007 film written by and starring drag queen RuPaul. It is the fourth in a series of films starring the title character, a top secret government agent and supermodel. The original three films (collectively titled RuPaul Is: Starbooty!) were all made in the mid-1980s by RuPaul and his friends with a budget of around $100, and were sold out of shopping carts around gay bars in Atlanta, Georgia.

Plot
The film's plot combines several elements from these original films. Starrbooty (RuPaul) is in the middle of a major karate fight when she receives a phone call informing her that her adopted niece Cornisha has been kidnapped. With the help of fellow crime fighter Agent Page Turner, Starrbooty learns that her nemesis Annaka Manners is using her billion-dollar cosmetics company as a front for kidnapping prostitutes and selling their organs on the black market. Starrbooty also discovers that Annaka is actually her long-lost sister, making Cornisha Annaka's daughter.

Page and Starrbooty go undercover as prostitutes (as Pepper and Cupcake, respectively) and in order to be convincing enough to infiltrate Annaka's inner sanctum, they go "all the way" (this includes numerous sex scenes with explicit male nudity, generally designed for laughs). When Starrbooty finally confronts Annaka she discovers that Cornisha was in on the plot all along, and has become Annaka's lover. Informing them that they are actually mother and daughter, Starrbooty reveals Annaka's plans to double-cross Cornisha by selling her clitoris to a wealthy socialite (in one of the more memorable jokes, Annaka is also planning to sell Starrbooty's long legs to a "famous female rapper," quipping, "I guess they won't call her 'Lil' anymore!").

A final showdown between Starrbooty and Annaka leaves Annaka dead, and they are able to salvage Cornisha's genitals by taking Annaka's (a perfect biological match). Thus everyone who deserves to lives happily ever after.

Cast
 RuPaul as Starrbooty/Cupcake
 Lahoma Van Zandt as Page Turner/Pepper
 Candis Cayne as Annaka Manners
 Gus Mattox as Max
 Jazmine Jimenez as Cornisha
 Dee Finley as Diesel Fortensky
 Corey Corey as Junebug
 Michael Lucas as Alexi Popov
 Owen Hawk as Dirty Talker
 Richard Lynch as Ol' Smeller
 Lady Bunny as Ms. Tasha
 Laura Forbes as Mrs. McGillicutty
 Ari Gold as Tyrone Cohen
 Tim Wallis as T'Misha
 Kayla Aguirre as Kim She
 Sweetie as Ol' Lestra
 Kayvon Zand as Suicide bomber
 Andre Robert Lee as Barley
 Joe Ovbey as Kidnap caller
 Ray Stewart as Doctor
 Joelle Hawkes (Pezely) as Nurse
 Wilmer Fernandez as Manner man
 Dale Kan as Receptionist

Production
During production the film's working title was Starrbooty: Reloaded, but when screened at film festivals it was simply called Starrbooty. The DVD title is Starrbooty: The Movie.

The film is an homage to blaxploitation and sexploitation films of the 1960s and 1970s. In an article for EdgePhiladelphia, RuPaul stated, "The goal was to make an exploitation film that was part Russ Meyer, part John Waters and part The Naked Gun." The film utilizes things like obvious vocal overdubbing, grainy footage and dramatic cuts to mimic these low-budget films of the past.

Screenings and reception
The film began screening at various gay and lesbian film festivals in July 2007. RuPaul presented the film in person at each screening, often with other cast members. Erik Schut of The Philly Film Guide said "Starrbooty is a fried, dyed and laid to the side-splitting kick-ass good time!" It was the only film at the Philadelphia Gay & Lesbian Film Festival to be sold out at both screenings.

The movie's supporting cast is primarily made up of pornographic film stars, both male and female. It is unrated, and though there is no explicit sex, it does feature several of its male stars frontally nude and erect, and at one point RuPaul is depicted graphically fondling a man's penis. Though this is primarily played for comic effect, it is a marked departure from the "Drag Queen Next Door" image RuPaul cultivated during the height of her fame.

The film ends with an on-screen dedication to Jerry Falwell.

The DVD was released October 30, 2007. There was no distribution deal reached, and thus it was released by RuPaul under the imprint "Starbooty, Inc."

Soundtrack
Starrbooty: Original Motion Picture Soundtrack was released June 20, 2017.

 Call Me Starrbooty
 The Call (Interlude)
 A Fistful Of Booty
 Damn You Annaka! (Interlude)
 Big Booty Opening
 Alexi Popov (Interlude)
 How 2 Rock It
 Can't Fake It With The Johns (Interlude)
 Do The Right Thing
 Cupcake & Pepper (Interlude)
 Sweet Pussycat Of Mine
 Ol’ Smeller (Interlude)
 Pussycat 4 Sale
 CBT Session (Interlude)
 Put Some Weight On It
 Miss Tasha (Interlude)
 Drop That Pimp
 Diesel Pancake Makeup (Interlude)
 Call Me Starrbooty (Gomi's Cellular Edit)
 Cupcake Meets Annaka (Interlude)
 Booty Love
 Dismembership (Interlude)
 Call Me Starrbooty (View To A Booty)
 Epilogue (Interlude)
 Hey Booty

Notes

References

External links
 Official film site
 
 

2007 films
2007 LGBT-related films
American LGBT-related films
Films with screenplays by RuPaul
Transgender-related films
2007 directorial debut films
Drag (clothing)-related films
2000s English-language films
2000s American films